Out of Order is a 1987 British comedy-drama film directed by Jonnie Turpie and starring Gary Webster, Natasha Williams and George Baker. The screenplay concerns an unemployed layabout who shocks his family and friends by joining the police force.

Cast
 Sharon Fryer ...  Jaz Bailey
 Pete Lee-Wilson ...  Billy Bannister
 Natasha Williams ...  Veronica
 Cheryl Maiker ...  Susan
 Gary Webster ...  Anthony Campbell
 Timmy Lawrence ...  Glynis
 Sandra Lawrence ...  Sandra
 Dicken Ashworth ...  Pool Player
 Buster Bloodvessel ... Jailer
 Annette Badland ...  Operator
 George Baker ...  Chief Inspector
 Peter Cellier ...  Home Secretary
 Glynn Edwards ...  Barman
 Roland Gift ...  Customer
 Susan Hanson ...  Anthony's Mum
 Don Henderson ...  Car Driver
 Stephen Lewis ...  Bus Driver
 Al Matthews ...  U.S. DJ
 Garfield Morgan ...  Drill Sergeant
 Tony Scoggo ...  Man in Pub
 Ricky Tomlinson ...  Decorator
 Frank Windsor ...  Traffic Warden
 Peter Woods ...  Newsreader
 David Yip ...  Policeman
 Steven Hartley ...  CID
 Tony Walsh ...  CID
 Richard Ireson ...  Teacher
 Robert McBain ...  CO Armstrong
 Martin Gower ...  PC Jones
 Laurence Harrington ...  Inspector Proudlock
 Godfrey James ...  Desk Sergeant

References

External links

1987 films
1987 comedy-drama films
1980s English-language films
British comedy-drama films
1980s British films